Honor (or Honour) Among Thieves is a phrase suggesting trustworthiness within a group that is not considered trustworthy to outsiders. It may also refer to:

Books
 Honour Among Thieves (novel), a 1993 novel by English author Jeffrey Archer.
 Honour Among Thieves, a 1947 novel by H. C. Bailey
 Honour Among Thieves, a 1991 novel by Donald Serrell Thomas
 Honor Among Thieves, a 2014 novel by James S. A. Corey
 Honor Among Thieves, a 2018 novel by Ann Aguirre and Rachel Caine

Film and TV
 Touchez pas au grisbi, a 1954 French-Italian film released in the UK as Honour Among Thieves
 Adieu l'ami, a 1968 French-Italian film starring Charles Bronson reissued as Honor Among Thieves
 Dungeons & Dragons: Honor Among Thieves, a 2023 American fantasy heist film set for release in 2023

Television
 "Honor Among Thieves" (Person of Interest), a 2014 episode of Person of Interest
 "Honor Among Thieves" (Star Trek: Deep Space Nine), a 1998 episode of Star Trek: Deep Space Nine
 "Honor Among Thieves", episode 4 of The Flash
 "Honor Among Thieves", episode 5 of White Collar season 4
 "Honor Among Thieves", episode 20 of Criminal Minds season 2
 "Honour Among Thieves", episode 76 of The Bill series 9
 "Honor Among Thieves?", episode 16 of Miami Vice season 4
 ”Honor Among Thieves”, episode 20 in season 2 of Criminal Minds

Games
 Sly 3: Honor Among Thieves, the third game in the Sly Cooper franchise
 Uncharted 2: Among Thieves, the second game in the Uncharted franchise

Music
 Honor Among Thieves (Artful Dodger album) 1976
 Honor Among Thieves (Edwin McCain album) 1995
 Honor Among Thieves, an album by Antiseen
 Honor Among Thieves (The Brandos album) 1987
 "Honour Among Thieves", a song by Gunship on the 2018 album Dark All Day

See also
 Among Thieves (disambiguation)